Slimane Chenine is an Algerian politician. He served as president of the lower house of Algeria's parliament, the People's National Assembly, from 10 July 2019 until the parliament dissolved on 18 February 2021.

In September 2021, Chenine was appointed ambassador to Libya.

References 

Living people
Year of birth missing (living people)
Place of birth missing (living people)
21st-century Algerian politicians
Presidents of the People's National Assembly of Algeria